Andrzej Marcinkowski (28 February 1929 in Poznań – 13 March 2010) was a Polish lawyer and politician. He served as the acting Polish Minister of Justice from 25 November 1991 until 5 December 1991 within the government of Prime Minister Jan Krzysztof Bielecki. He was a recipient of the Commander's Cross and Commander's Cross with Star of the Order of Polonia Restituta.

Marcinkowski died on 13 March 2010, at the age of 81.

1929 births
2010 deaths
20th-century Polish lawyers
Commanders with Star of the Order of Polonia Restituta
Politicians from Poznań
Warsaw Uprising insurgents